Regina Vázquez Saut (born 11 September 1981) is a Mexican politician affiliated with the PRI. As of 2013 she served as Deputy of both the LIX and  LXII  Legislatures of the Mexican Congress representing Veracruz.

References

1981 births
Living people
Politicians from Veracruz
Women members of the Chamber of Deputies (Mexico)
Institutional Revolutionary Party politicians
21st-century Mexican politicians
21st-century Mexican women politicians
Deputies of the LXII Legislature of Mexico
Members of the Chamber of Deputies (Mexico) for Veracruz